Hans Standl (11 February 1926 – 23 March 2021) was a German sports shooter. He competed in the 25 metre pistol event at the 1968 Summer Olympics for West Germany. Standl died in March 2021 at the age of 95.

References

External links
 

1926 births
2021 deaths
German male sport shooters
Olympic shooters of West Germany
Sportspeople from Füssen
Shooters at the 1968 Summer Olympics